The 2013 Seguros Bolívar Open Medellín was a professional tennis tournament played on clay courts. It was the tenth edition of the tournament which was part of the 2013 ATP Challenger Tour. It took place in Medellín, Colombia between July 22 and 28 2013.

Singles main draw entrants

Seeds

 1 Rankings are as of July 15, 2013.

Other entrants
The following players received wildcards into the singles main draw:
  Alvaro Ochoa
  Giovanni Lapentti
  Eduardo Struvay
  Felipe Mantilla

The following players received entry from the qualifying draw:
  Roberto Quiroz
  Daniel Elahi Galán
  Felipe Escobar
  Steffen Zornosa

Champions

Singles

 Alejandro González def.  Guido Andreozzi, 6–4, 6–4

Doubles

 Emilio Gómez /  Roman Borvanov def.  Nicolás Barrientos /  Eduardo Struvay, 6–3, 7–6(7–4)

External links
 Official Website

Seguros Bolivar Open Medellin
Seguros Bolívar Open Medellín
2013 in Colombian tennis